Movement Electronic Music Festival is an annual electronic dance music event held in the birthplace of Techno, Detroit, each Memorial Day weekend since 2006. Previous electronic music festivals held at Hart Plaza on Memorial Day weekend include Detroit Electronic Music Festival (2000–2002), Movement (2003–2004) and Fuse-In (2005).  The four different festival names reflect completely separate and distinct producers, brands and directions. All of these festivals presented performances by musicians and DJs that emphasized the progressive qualities of the culture surrounding electronic music including the celebration of Detroit being the birthplace of the popular electronic music subgenre Techno.

In late 2013, the original DEMF management announced plans for the return of the Detroit Electronic Music Festival as a free-admission event at Campus Martius Park on Independence Day weekend, 2014, along with the paid-admission Federation of Electronic Music Technology (FEMT), a concurrent conference and music showcase at Ford Field. These events were later rescheduled for 2015. These events are not connected to the Movement Electronic Music Festival planned for Memorial Day weekend in Hart Plaza.

In 2017, Movement was nominated for Festival of the Year at the Electronic Music Awards.

Movement is scheduled to return on May 28–30, 2022 at Hart Plaza.

History 
The first electronic music festival held in Detroit was the Detroit Electronic Music Festival in 2000, produced by Carol Marvin and her organization Pop Culture Media (which included long-time event producer Adriel Thornton, Telo Dunne and Barbara Deyo and others). Taking place in Detroit's Hart Plaza, it was a landmark event that brought visitors from all over the world to celebrate Techno music in the city of its birth. The event was one of the first electronic music festivals in the United States.

Ford Motor Company provided an unprecedented $435,000 for Title sponsorship of the 2001 event, which was renamed the Focus Detroit Electronic Music Festival. This allowed the free-of-charge event to continue to be a gift to the fans and made the festival a profitable venture in its second year. Festival producer Pop Culture Media, with Carol Marvin at the helm, worked with Ford to create a nationwide television ad campaign featuring the music of Detroit Techno founder Juan Atkins.
Controversy ensued when producer Carol Marvin reluctantly fired artistic director Carl Craig for breach of contract.

In January 2003, Detroit city Mayor Kwame Kilpatrick decided to override the Recreation Department (which controls and manages Hart Plaza) and secured Hart Plaza and the Memorial Day weekend dates for Derrick May, who had extensive experience as a touring DJ but no firsthand, large-scale festival production experience. May put a first class team in place, which included a donation by Philadelphia-based P.A.W.N. LASERS / Louis Capet XXVI,  but the biggest hurdle faced by the Festival was the City Of Detroit's withdrawal of $350,000 funding that it had provided in previous years.

The second Movement festival took place in 2004, but despite its public success, the event faced significant financial losses and its fate became uncertain.

In February 2005, May announced his resignation as festival producer, and the festival once again changed hands. Fellow techno veteran Kevin Saunderson announced plans for a Movement replacement to be called Fuse-In Detroit (later shortened to just Fuse-In, with the tagline "Detroit's Electronic Movement") to be staged Memorial Day Weekend 2005.

Successful negotiations with city officials led to 2005 becoming the first year that an event in Hart Plaza did not have free admission. A total of 41,220 admission passes were sold to Fuse-In visitors. 38,382 daily passes were sold for $10 each, and 2,838 weekend passes, covering the full three days, were sold for $25 each. The City of Detroit collected $1 per pass, and was to have collected 30% of festival profits, but admission pass sales did not recoup the festival's $756,000 budget.

On February 16, 2006, Kevin Saunderson announced that due to financial losses and lack of sufficient promotion, he would not continue to produce the festival in 2006.  As of March 23, Paxahau of Detroit, Michigan, an event production company that has worked with Craig, May, and Saunderson, secured the venue and dates from Saunderson to produce the festival under the name "Movement." Paxahau has been producing their festival from 2006 to present, celebrating their 10-year anniversary in 2016.

2007: Movement 

In 2007 the festival took place over a span of three days, May 26-May 28, 2007.

2008: Movement 
In 2008 the festival took place over a three-day span, May 24-May 26, 2008. Ticket prices this year were set at $40 presale or $55 at the door for a weekend pass, and $175 for a VIP Pass.

2009: Movement 

Movement 2009 took place from Saturday, May 23, 2009 thru Monday, May 25, 2009 in Hart Plaza in Detroit, Michigan.
These two mobile friendly sites include information about after parties, lodging and an easy to read schedule
https://web.archive.org/web/20090523094210/http://www.mpiii.com/demf/ or http://www.detroitluv.com. The weekend overlaps with CouchSurfing's event CouchCrash http://spreadsheets.google.com/ccc?key=p4O1URhzhzraofuYB9cMcIg and with the International Swordfighting and Martial Arts Convention

2010: Movement 
Movement 2010 took place May 29–31, 2010. This was the 10th anniversary of Detroit's yearly electronic music festival.  Plastikman confirmed his appearance on his official website.   Other confirmed artists include Mr. Scruff, Ida Engberg, Jamie Jones, and Woody McBride.

2011: Movement 
Movement 2011 was held on May 28–30, 2011 and took place at Hart Plaza in Detroit, Michigan; the same location as every year since its inception. Featured artists this year include Fatboy Slim, Carl Craig, Beardyman, Felix da Housecat, and Skrillex.  This year's "secret artist" listed on the lineup is Ricardo Villalobos, who, to the disappointment of many, was not allowed entrance into the US last year.

2012: Movement 
Movement 2012 was held on May 26–28, 2012 at Hart Plaza in Detroit, Michigan; the same location as every year since its inception.

2013: Movement
Movement 2013 took place on May 25–27, once again in Hart Plaza. The lineup for the 2013 edition of the festival includes the following 116 acts:

2014: Movement
Movement 2014 will take place on May 24–26, once again in Hart Plaza. The lineup  for the 2014 edition of the festival will include the following 121 acts  :

J. Phlip closed out Movement 2014 on the Beatport Stage after a last minute cancellation of the originally booked artist.

2015: Movement

2016: Movement

2017: Movement

Attendance 
Historically, attendance of events held in Hart Plaza has often been reported as being well in excess of the  venue's capacity of 40,000 people, even when crowds were counted by police and city officials. The reported attendance estimates for the electronic music festival were as follows:

 DEMF 2000: 1.1 to 1.5 million
 DEMF 2001: 1.7 million
 DEMF 2002: 1.7 million
 Movement 2003: 630,000
 Movement 2004: 150,000 
 Fuse-In 2005: 44,920
 Movement 2006: 41,000
 Movement 2007: 43,337
 Movement 2008: 75,000
 Movement 2009: 83,322
 Movement 2010: 95,000
 Movement 2011: 99,282
 Movement 2012: 107,343

Notes

See also

 List of electronic music festivals
 Detroit International Jazz Festival

Notes and references

External links 

 Put your hands up: An oral history of Detroit's electronic music festival
 Detroit Techno & The Electronic Music Festival: Retrospective

Music festivals in Detroit
Tourist attractions in Detroit
Electronic music festivals in the United States
Music festivals established in 2000